Centesima (minor planet designation: 513 Centesima) is a 50 km Main-belt asteroid orbiting the Sun. It is one of the core members of the Eos family of asteroids. Relatively little is known about this tiny asteroid. It is not known to possess any natural satellites, so its mass is unknown.  However, its brief rotation period of just over 5 hours implies that the body must be exceptionally dense, for its gravity is able counteract the centrifugal force. It was discovered 24 August 1903 by late-nineteenth- and early-twentieth-century astronomer Max Wolf. It was his 100th asteroid discovery, hence the name, which in Latin, means "hundredth".

References

External links
 
 

Eos asteroids
Centesima
Centesima
S-type asteroids (Tholen)
K-type asteroids (SMASS)
19030824